Mehmet Batdal (born 24 February 1986) is a Turkish professional footballer who plays as a forward.

Club career
On 18 May 2010, Galatasaray signed Batdal on a three-year deal.

International career
In November 2016 Batdal received his first call-up to the senior Turkey squad for the match against Kosovo.

References

External links

1986 births
Living people
Footballers from İzmir
Turkish footballers
Turkey under-21 international footballers
Turkey B international footballers
Süper Lig players
TFF First League players
Bucaspor footballers
Altay S.K. footballers
Galatasaray S.K. footballers
Konyaspor footballers
Kardemir Karabükspor footballers
İstanbul Başakşehir F.K. players
Ankaraspor footballers
Fatih Karagümrük S.K. footballers
Association football forwards